George Crandall may refer to:

George Crandall, character in The FBI Story
George Crandall, character in The 13th Man